Cries from Syria is a 2017 documentary film about the Syrian Civil War, directed by Evgeny Afineevsky, and acquired by HBO. It contains video shot by Syrians with and interviews with guerilla fighters, activists, journalists, defected military men, and refugees, some that are children.

In an interview Afineesky said, "I tried to put together a comprehensive story so that people can not only learn from the historical mistakes, but so people can reevaluate what we have on our hands."

On November 2, 2017, Afineevsky was named the Best Director at the annual Critics' Choice Movie Awards in New York (conducted by the Broadcast Film Critics Association and the Broadcast Television Journalists Association). The nominations for Cries from Syria were Best Documentary, Best Director and Best Song in a Documentary (‘Prayers for this World’ written by Diane Warren, and recorded by Cher along with the West Los Angeles Children's Choir).. The film won the Cinema for Peace Most Valuable Documentary Award in 2018.

References

External links

 Cries from Syria on HBO
 

2017 documentary films
2017 films
American documentary films
Czech documentary films
Documentary films about war
Films directed by Evgeny Afineevsky
HBO documentary films
2010s American films